Juan José Castro (March 7, 1895September 3, 1968) was an Argentine composer and conductor.

Born in Avellaneda, Castro studied piano and violin under Manuel Posadas and composition under Eduardo Fornarini, in Buenos Aires. In the 1920s he was awarded the Europa Prize, and then went on to study in Paris at the Schola Cantorum under Vincent d'Indy and Édouard Risler. Returning to Buenos Aires in 1925, he was named conductor of the Renacimiento Chamber Orchestra in 1928 and the Teatro Colón in 1930. From 1939 to 1943 he was a professor at the Buenos Aires Conservatory.

Castro's international career began in the 1940s.  In 1947 he conducted the Havana Philharmonic, and the Sodre Orchestra in Uruguay in 1949. In 1952-53 he was the conductor of the Melbourne Symphony Orchestra (then known as the Victorian Symphony Orchestra) in Australia.  He returned to the Americas and conducted the National Symphony in Buenos Aires from 1956-1960. From 1960 to 1964, he was director of the Conservatory of Music of Puerto Rico.

Castro's brothers, José María and Washington, were also both composers.  Juan José Castro married the daughter of the composer Julián Aguirre. He died in Buenos Aires in 1968, aged 73.

Works
Note: This list is incomplete
Violin Sonata, 1914
Cello Sonata, 1916
Piano Sonata No. 1, 1917
A una madre, 1925
Symphony No. 1, 1931
Biblical Symphony, 1932
Mekhano, ballet, 1934
Sinfonia Argentina, 1934
Symphony No. 3, 1936
Symphony No. 4, 1939
Piano Sonata No. 2, 1939
Offenbachiana, ballet, 1940
Piano Concerto, 1941
String Quartet, 1942
La zapatera prodigosa opera after Federico García Lorca, 1943
Martin Fierro, cantata, 1944
El Llanto de las Sierras, 1947
Corales Criollos No. 1 & 2, piano, 1947
Proserpina y el extranjero (Proserpina and the Foreigner), opera after Omar del Carlo, 1951
Bodas de sangre (Marriage of Blood), opera after Lorca, 1952
Corales Criollos No. 3, orchestra, 1953
Symphony No. 5, 1956
Epitafio en ritmos y sonidos, chorus and orchestra, 1961
Suite introspectiva, orchestra, 1962

Notes

References
Don Randel, The Harvard Biographical Dictionary of Music. Harvard, 1996, p. 144.

1895 births
1968 deaths
People from Avellaneda
Argentine people of Galician descent
Argentine conductors (music)
Male conductors (music)
Argentine classical composers
Schola Cantorum de Paris alumni
20th-century classical composers
20th-century conductors (music)
Male classical composers
20th-century male musicians